Humanyze, founded as Sociometric Solutions in 2010 in Boston, Massachusetts, is a people analytics software provider. Humanyze was founded by MIT doctoral students Ben Waber, Daniel Olguin, Taemie Kim, Tuomas Jaanu, and MIT Professor Alex Pentland. Based on research from the MIT Media Lab, Humanyze's people analytics platform uses Organizational Network Analysis to measure corporate communication data to uncover patterns on how work gets done in companies.

Company History 
The founders Waber, Olguin, Kim, and Jaanu, met while completing their Ph.D.s at the MIT Media Lab in Professor “Sandy” Pentland’s Human Dynamics group. Sociometric Solutions Inc. was incorporated on October 26, 2010, as a research and consulting firm. In 2015, the company was rebranded as "Humanyze" and transitioned from a consulting firm to a software company. They raised $4 million in Series A financing from Romulus Capital and launched their people analytics software, the Humanyze Platform, at the end of 2016.

While at the MIT Media Lab, Humanyze’s founders developed a sociometric badge, a high-tech I.D. card. With the sociometric badge, they pioneered ways of collecting in-person collaboration data. This badge had sensors to measure the frequency and duration of face-to-face interactions. It did not record content, web activity, or personal activities. It did not have GPS. The Sociometric Badge has since been discontinued for commercial use as the Humanyze Platform evolved to work primarily with digital collaboration data and corporate-owned building entry card systems.

In October 2021, the company officially received patents for their system and method for transforming communication metadata and sensor data into an objective measure of the communication distribution of an organization.

Products 
Humanyze's people analytics platform measures corporate communication data to uncover patterns on how work gets done. Human resources, operations, and corporate real estate professionals use the platform to analyze workplace data in real-time to make informed decisions around organizational health, workplace strategy, and business process optimization. It is a web-based dashboard. A variety of data sources can be plugged into the Humanyze Platform including Microsoft Office Exchange, Google Suite, Skype, Microsoft Teams, HR information system outputs, and building access card logs.

Data Privacy 
No personal data is provided to Humanyze, including employee profiles (names and email addresses). All data is encrypted, aggregated, and anonymized. No communication content is recorded. There is no personally identifiable information (PII) or private confidential information (PCI). Humanyze is GDPR and EU Privacy Shield compliant.

News 
The company has been covered in the media by various news and technology sources including New Scientist, The Boston Globe, CBS News, Businessweek, NPR, CNN, and the New York Times. Humanyze's clients have included Bank of America, the United States Army, NASA, and BCG. The company's research has supported the importance of face-to-face interactions and communication, and building larger networks among peers.

Since the COVID-19 pandemic, Humanyze’s research has also been cited in publications such as The Economist, New York Times Magazine, HBR, The Boston Business Journal, and Work Design Magazine in debates about the impact of remote work on productivity and effectiveness.

Research 
When Humanyze’s founders were researching their Ph.D.s at the MIT Media Lab, they tested whether measuring all communication content from emails, texts, and in-person conversations would provide more insight. They measured over 100 MB of data per person per day.[source] With all of this data, they found that it was difficult to extract communication patterns. So, they tested measuring the frequency and duration of communication instead: timestamps of communication, length of conversations, and which teams talked to which teams. They found that the degree of accuracy was negligible; measuring content was extraneous and unnecessary.

Humanyze's founders have published 50+ research articles. One finding from the firm's research was that simple physical changes, such as having larger tables in a cafeteria, facilitated more interaction and collaboration among colleagues than smaller tables. Another finding emphasized the importance of group breaks and office spaces which facilitate such breaks as having an important effect on employee morale and efficacy.

References

External links

Software companies of the United States
Technology companies based in the Boston area
2010 establishments in Massachusetts
Software companies established in 2010
American companies established in 2010